This is a list of Arizona suffragists, suffrage groups and others associated with the cause of women's suffrage in Arizona.

Groups 

 Arizona Woman's Equal Rights Association (AWERA), founded in 1887.
Arizona Equal Suffrage Association (AESA).
Arizona Federation of Colored Women's Clubs (AFCWC), created around 1915.
Arizona Suffrage Association, formed in 1891.
Equal Suffrage Club of Pima County.
Phoenix Civic League.
Women's Christian Temperance Union (WCTU) of Arizona.

Suffragists 
 Rosa Meador Goodrich Boido (Pima County).
Maybelle Craig (Phoenix).
Josephine Brawley Hughes (Tucson).
Sally Jacobs (Phoenix).
Elizabeth Layton (Thatcher).
Inez Lee (Thatcher).
Frances Munds (Prescott).
 Pauline O'Neill.
Rose G. Randall (Payson).
Lida P. Robinson.
Hattie Talbot (Phoenix).
Madge Udall.
Agnes Wallace (Prescott).
Mary J. West (Snowflake).

Politicians supporting women's suffrage 

 William Herring.
Louis C. Hughes (Tucson).
George W. P. Hunt.
 Murate Masterson (Prescott).
Nathan O. Murphy.
Theodore Roosevelt.
Kean St. Charles (Mohave County).

Places 

 Hotel Adams (Phoenix).

Suffragists campaigning in Arizona 

 Mary C. C. Bradford.
Josephine Casey.
Carrie Chapman Catt.
Laura Clay.
Laura Gregg.
 Mary Garrett Hay.
Laura M. Johns.
Alice Park.
Jane Pincus.
Anna Howard Shaw.
Frances Woods.

Anti-suffragists 
Politicians who opposed women's suffrage

 Joseph H. Kibbey (Phoenix).

Anti-suffragists campaigning in Arizona

 Mabel G. Millard.
 Frances Williams.

See also 

 Timeline of women's suffrage in Arizona
 Women's suffrage in Arizona
 Women's suffrage in states of the United States
 Women's suffrage in the United States

References

Sources 

 

 

Arizona suffrage

Arizona suffragists
Activists from Arizona
History of Arizona
Suffragists